William Manchester was a historian.

William Manchester may also refer to:

William Manchester (MP) for Carlisle (UK Parliament constituency) 
William Montagu, 7th Duke of Manchester
William Montagu, 2nd Duke of Manchester
William Montagu, 5th Duke of Manchester
William Montagu, 9th Duke of Manchester